James Anderson (b. Swindon, Wiltshire 1936 – d. Penarth, Glamorganshire 2007) was a British author. He is best known for his books featuring Inspector Wilkins. Set in the 1930s, the action of the books takes place in a large fictional British estate, or stately home, belonging to George Henry Aylvin Saunders, the 12th Earl of Burford. The books are a humorous look at the Golden Age type of mystery, which feature whodunnits set during a house party, and contain joking references to Inspector Appleby, the detective created by Michael Innes, or Inspector Alleyn, created by Ngaio Marsh, and to the well-known private detective Hercule Poirot, invented by Agatha Christie.

Anderson also wrote novelizations based on the television series Murder, She Wrote.

He died in 2007 in Penarth, Vale of Glamorgan.

Bibliography
Inspector Wilkins books
 The Affair of the Blood-stained Egg Cosy [McKay-Washburn 1975]
 The Affair of the Mutilated Mink
 The Affair of the 39 Cufflinks

Novelizations based on Murder, She Wrote
 The Murder of Sherlock Holmes [Avon 1985]
 Hooray for Hollywood
 Lovers and Other Killers

Mikael Petros books
 Assassin [Simon & Schuster 1971]
 The Abolition of Death {Constable 1974]

Other works
 The Alpha List
 Appearance of Evil [Constable 1977]
 Angel of Death [Constable 1978]
 Assault and Matrimony
 Auriol
 Additional Evidence

References

1936 births
2007 deaths
English mystery writers
English male novelists
20th-century English novelists
20th-century English male writers